In mathematics, superstrong may refer to:
Superstrong cardinal in set theory
Superstrong approximation in algebraic group theory